Zhang Zhiting (born 21 December 1995) is a Chinese basketball player. She represented China at the 2018 FIBA 3x3 World Cup, as well as for the Women's 3x3 basketball team in the 2020 Summer Olympics in Tokyo, Japan.

References

1995 births
Living people
Chinese women's basketball players
Centers (basketball)
Basketball players from Shanghai
Shanghai Swordfish players
Asian Games medalists in basketball
Basketball players at the 2018 Asian Games
Asian Games gold medalists for China
Medalists at the 2018 Asian Games
3x3 basketball players at the 2020 Summer Olympics
Olympic 3x3 basketball players of China
Chinese women's 3x3 basketball players
Medalists at the 2020 Summer Olympics
Olympic bronze medalists for China
Olympic medalists in 3x3 basketball